Charles Lincoln White (January 22, 1863 – 1941) was the 13th President of Colby College, Maine, United States from 1901–1908.

Early life
White was born in Nashua, New Hampshire, to George and Harriet Richardson White.  He was educated at Woburn High School and graduated from Brown University in 1887 where he was a member of Delta Upsilon, and Newton Theological Institution in 1889.

Career
He was pastor at Somersworth Baptist Church, New Hampshire from 1890-1894, and the First Church of Nashua from 1894-1900.

Presidency
He was called to the presidency of Colby College in June 1901, having served as the general secretary of the New Hampshire Baptist Convention the year previous. He remained at the head of the college until 1908.

Foss Dining Hall was built in 1904, named after Eliza Foss Dexter, from whom he coaxed the money.

Post-Presidency
He received the degree of D. D. from Bowdoin College in 1902.  After his presidency, he moved to Brooklyn, NY with his family and worked as a manuscript secretary.

Published works
 (still in print)

References

External links

Presidents of Colby College
Brown University alumni
Colby College faculty
1863 births
1941 deaths
Bowdoin College alumni
People from Somersworth, New Hampshire
People from Nashua, New Hampshire
Woburn Memorial High School alumni